Rick Jhonatan Lima Morais (born 2 September 1999), simply known as Rick, is a Brazilian footballer who currently plays as a forward for Bulgarian club Ludogorets Razgrad.

Club career

Ceará
Born in São Luís, Maranhão, Rick joined Ceará's youth setup in 2018, after starting it out at Moto Club's futsal team and subsequently representing Boca Júnior and Grêmio. He made his first team debut on 25 August of that year, coming on as a second-half substitute in a 0–1 home loss against Ferroviário, for the season's Copa Fares Lopes.

Rick made his professional debut on 18 January 2019, replacing Felipe Silva in a 5–0 Copa do Nordeste home routing of Sampaio Corrêa. His Série A debut occurred on 20 May, in a 2–1 home win against his former side Grêmio.

Ludogorets Razgrad
On 19 December 2021, Ceará announced Rick's transfer to Bulgarian side Ludogorets Razgrad. During the winter training camp in January 2023, Rick received a serious injury sending him out from play for at least 6 months.

Career statistics

Honours
Ceará
Copa do Nordeste: 2020

Ludogorets Razgrad
Bulgarian First League: 2021–22
Bulgarian Supercup: 2022

References

External links
Ceará profile 

1999 births
Living people
People from São Luís, Maranhão
Brazilian footballers
Association football forwards
Campeonato Brasileiro Série A players
First Professional Football League (Bulgaria) players
Ceará Sporting Club players
PFC Ludogorets Razgrad players
Brazilian expatriate footballers
Brazilian expatriate sportspeople in Bulgaria
Expatriate footballers in Bulgaria
Sportspeople from Maranhão